Leslie Delatour (1950–2001) was a Haitian economist who served as governor of the Bank of the Republic of Haiti from 1994 to 1998, and as Haiti's Minister of Finance from 1986 to 1988.

Biography 
Born in 1950, he studied at Johns Hopkins University and at the University of Chicago. Notable as Haiti's Minister of Finance and Governor of the Bank of the Republic of Haiti, he also served as consultant at the World Bank, the Inter-American Development Bank, and USAID. He was dubbed as "all-powerful" in Le Monde Diplomatique. He died of cancer on 24 January 2001 in Miami, Florida, United States. His widow has since married Haiti's President René Préval and his family maintains influence in Haiti.

His first notable job in Haiti was working in 1982 for Finance Minister Marc Bazin under the administration of Jean-Claude Duvalier.  Bazin became favoured in international circles for an anti-corruption drive that he held as Finance Minister but was removed from his post after five months. After Jean-Claude Duvalier was ousted on 7 February 1986, Delatour was chosen to be Minister of Finance starting in April 1986 under the dictatorship of General Henri Namphy. There, he subjected Haiti to neoliberal reforms and argued that as Haiti would always be dependent on someone so, it might as well be dependent on the United States.

This was not popular in Haiti. Popular leader Jean-Bertrand Aristide dubbed this the "death plan". In June 1986, five days of major protests took place throughout Haiti, the protesters demanding Delatour's resignation. Henri Namphy said that this led to "almost a civil war" and promised to hold elections as a result. A November 1986 general strike followed, again with Delatour's dismissal demanded. Namphy had believed that as he led a provisional government, that it had no business carrying out sweeping reforms. Delatour believed otherwise. These reforms damaged a peasantry that had already suffered the 1982 destruction of their Creole pigs by U.S. orders as a response to an outbreak of African Swine Fever. There was an account that, at one point, Delatour became part of a hit list of Aristide's Interior Minister, Brigadier General Mondesir Beaubrun due to his position of taxing the elite. The minister has been accused of carrying out assassinations of Aristide's political opponents.

In the 1960s François Duvalier closed all Haiti's ports except that of Port-au-Prince; Delatour had them reopened and contraband poured into the country. He reduced tariffs on imported rice and reduced the budget of the government agricultural agency in the rice-producing Artibonite by 30%. He reasoned that Haitians were wasting their time with inefficient agriculture, that the law of comparative advantage dictated that Haiti move much of its rural population to the cities where they could serve as cheap labour for industrial assembly plants as part of the global supply chain. He thus accelerated the neoliberalism introduced under Jean-Claude Duvalier whilst weakening the Haitian state, arguing that he was removing the means through which corrupt officials could steal development aid and sabotage profitable planning. He argued further that his reforms were reducing prices for food and other essentials.

Haiti's sugar industry was hit hard by his policies as Haiti's sugar company Hasco was shut down in April 1987 days after the Usine Sucrière des Cayes announced it was closing; these two events cost over 40,000 jobs. Delatour had shut down both state-owned sugar mills; the Usine Sucrière Nationale de Darbonne in the Léogâne area in the autumn of 1986 and also the Usine Sucrière Citadelle in Cap-Haïtien. The flooding of contraband Dominican sugar into the Haitian market promoted by Delatour's policies helped seal the fate of Haiti's sugar industry. Delatour explained that these sugar companies were not productive, citing that those owned by the government such as the Darbonne Sugar Refinery and Edible Oils producing plant ENAOL were running inefficiently and swallowed an unnecessarily large amount of government funds. These two corporations were partly funded by the Telephone Company.

His decision to open the country up to subsidised American rice helped drive domestic producers out of business and to the capital, Port-au-Prince, and most notably in the rapidly expanding shantytown of Cité Soleil. They could not all be absorbed into the cheap labour industrial sector so many ended up working in the informal sector, most notably in the charcoal trade helping to denude the hills further. The new imports of U.S. subsidised rice were protected by military convoys to protect it from peasants who tried to stop its transportation, part of the unrest his policies were causing. For this, the New York Times described him in 1987 as "reviled" in Haiti but celebrated by the U.S. government and by the International Monetary Fund and World Bank.

As such, after he left his post in February 1988 upon the end of the provisional military government, his presence as an advisor to governments became an important consideration for international aid and loans to be made available. To appease these forces who distrusted him based on his left wing reputation, Jean-Bertrand Aristide, who had previously denounced Delatour's "death plan", was compelled to make him part of his team in 1991 after he won the Haitian presidency.

In September 1991, Delatour openly condemned the coup d'état that deposed Aristide and brought Raoul Cédras and Michel François into power. His support for the deposed president was a very important factor in permitting Aristide to be restored to office in 1994. Shortly before Aristide's restoration, Delatour and Leslie Voltaire had presented to the powers a plan titled the "Strategy of Social and Economic Reconstruction", a set of neoliberal reforms, dubbed in Haiti "The American Plan", which helped convince the U.S. to proceed with Aristide's restoration.

In October 1994, after Aristide was restored to the presidency, Delatour threatened to not be involved in the government in order to force the neoliberal Smarck Michel, whose businesses included the rice importation that was damaging the Haitian peasantry, into the premiership. After Aristide capitulated to this demand, Delatour accepted the post of Governor of the Bank of the Republic of Haiti where he raised the interest rates consistent with his Chicago School ideological position. The reform programme he started in the mid-1980s was deepened under President René Préval, elected in December 1995, with the rice tariff slashed to 3%. With his help, Haiti became the most open country to trade in the whole Caribbean area. The cement factory and the flour mill were privatised in 1997 under the terms of his plan; both were since shut down, leaving Haiti without a flour mill nor with a cement factory.  He left midway through President René Préval's first term in 1998. He died in 2001. His widow is now René Préval's wife and his brothers Lionel Delatour and Patrick Delatour occupy important roles in the Haitian economy.

Legacy 
In 2007, Haiti's most valuable state-owned asset, Teleco, was privatised for a mere $59 million and 2,800 lost their jobs. Haiti is now described as "the most privatised country in the world". The collapse of Haitian agriculture and the expansion of Port-au-Prince's population is one of his most lasting legacies, and the mass casualties in the 2010 earthquake and the enfeebled government's inability to cope with it thus were brought about with his help. Haiti no longer produces cement so it is forced to pay to import cement from abroad for its reconstruction. The new plans for rebuilding Haiti are all drawn up according to Delatour's own frameworks and his brothers have key roles in executing these plans. Delatour's pro-globalization anti-nationalism and Haiti's economic decline under his influence also helped in promoting nostalgia for both Duvaliers and their respective regimes. As a result of his policies, in 2000, Haiti's per capita income had declined to $329 from $600 in 1980 during the height of Jean-Claude Duvalier's dictatorship. Haiti also lost its self-sufficiency in rice under his influence and it became increasingly vulnerable to international food price fluctuations as it was required to import its food. The 2008 food riots caused by international speculators too is part of Delatour's legacy.

References 

Mark D Danner, "The Struggle for a Democratic Haiti", The New York Times, 21 June 1987
Mark Danner, "Beyond the Mountains", Harper's,
Lisa McGowan, "Democracy Undermined", Development Group for Alternative Policies, January 1997
Todd Robberson, "Aristide Selects Business Leader for Prime Minister", Washington Post, 25 October 1994
Allan Nairn, "Aristide Banks on Austerity", Multinational Monitor
Adam Silvia, "The Day the Banks Stood Still: Haiti, The United States, and Monetary Policy in the 1980s", Florida State University

1950 births
2001 deaths
Finance ministers of Haiti
Governors of the Bank of the Republic of Haiti
Johns Hopkins University alumni
Haitian economists
University of Chicago alumni